The main protected areas of Croatia are national parks, nature parks and strict reserves. There are 444 protected areas of Croatia, encompassing 9% of the country. Those include 8 national parks in Croatia, 2 strict reserves and 11 nature parks. The most famous protected area and the oldest national park in Croatia is the Plitvice Lakes National Park, a UNESCO World Heritage Site. Velebit Nature Park is a part of the UNESCO Man and the Biosphere Programme. The strict and special reserves, as well as the national and nature parks, are managed and protected by the central government, while other protected areas are managed by counties. In 2005, the National Ecological Network was set up, as the first step in preparation of the EU accession and joining of the Natura 2000 network.

Each of the national parks is maintained by a separate institution, overseen and funded by the government ministry of nature conservation and spatial development. The State Institute for Nature Protection provides centralized oversight and expertise.

National parks 

All eight national parks are located in karst area.

Nature parks

Strict reserves 

Bijele and Samarske stijene
Hajdučki and Rožanski kukovi

Special reserves 

There are 80 special reserves in Croatia:
 37 forest vegetation reserves
 22 ornithological reserves
 9 botanical reserves
 2 ichthyological reserves
 2 ichthyological and ornithological reserves
 2 zoological reserves
 2 sea reserves
 1 geological and paleontological reserve
 1 paleontological reserve
 1 geographical and botanical reserve
 1 botanical and zoological reserve

See also 
Register of Protected Natural Values of the Republic of Croatia
Natural and Cultural Heritage of Croatia
List of World Heritage Sites in Croatia

References

External links 
  
Croatia - National parks

 
Croatia
Protected areas
Croatia
Lists of tourist attractions in Croatia